Kim Min-jong (born 1 September 2000) is a South Korean judoka.

He participated at the 2018 World Judo Championships, winning a medal.

In 2021, he competed in the men's +100 kg event at the 2021 Judo World Masters held in Doha, Qatar.

References

External links
 

2000 births
Living people
South Korean male judoka
Universiade medalists in judo
Universiade silver medalists for South Korea
Universiade bronze medalists for South Korea
Medalists at the 2019 Summer Universiade
Judoka at the 2020 Summer Olympics
Olympic judoka of South Korea
21st-century South Korean people